Clathrosepta becki is a species of sea snail, a marine gastropod mollusk in the family Fissurellidae, the keyhole limpets.

Description

Distribution
This marine species occurs off New Guinea.

References

 McLean J.H. & Geiger D.L. (1998). New genera and species having the Fissurisepta shell form, with a generic-level phylogenetic analysis (Gastropoda: Fissurellidae). Contributions in Science, Natural History Museum of Los Angeles County 475: 1–32

Fissurellidae
Gastropods described in 1998